The 2001 Palmer Cup was held on June 27–28, 2001 at the Baltusrol Golf Club, Springfield, New Jersey. The United States won 18 to 6.

Format
On Wednesday, there were four matches of four-ball in the morning, followed by four foursomes matches in the afternoon. Eight singles matches were played on the Thursday morning with a further eight more in the afternoon. In all, 24 matches were played.

Each of the 24 matches was worth one point in the larger team competition. If a match was all square after the 18th hole, each side earned half a point toward their team total. The team that accumulated at least 12½ points won the competition.

Teams
Eight college golfers from the United States and Great Britain and Ireland participated in the event.

Wednesday's matches

Morning four-ball

Afternoon foursomes

Thursday's matches

Morning singles

Afternoon singles

References

External links
Palmer Cup official site

Arnold Palmer Cup
Golf in New Jersey
Palmer Cup
Palmer Cup
Palmer Cup
Palmer Cup